Slovak Catholic Church may refer to:

 Catholic Church in Slovakia, incorporating all communities and institutions of the Catholic Church in Slovakia
 Slovak Greek Catholic Church, an Eastern Catholic church of the Byzantine Rite, centered in Slovakia
 Slovak Old-Catholic Church, an Old Catholic Church in Slovakia

See also 
 Slovak Church (disambiguation)